Toxophora virgata is a species of bee fly in the family Bombyliidae.

References

Bombyliidae
Articles created by Qbugbot
Taxa named by Carl Robert Osten-Sacken
Insects described in 1877